The 1948 Zandvoort Grand Prix was a non-championship Formula One race held on 7 August 1948 at Circuit Zandvoort.

Report 

The event consisted of two 24-lap heats and a 40-lap final. The cars were split based on their racing numbers, the lower numbers competing in Heat 1 and the higher numbers in Heat 2. A qualifying session determined the grid for each heat. Bob Gerard did not start the event; it is unclear whether he competed in his heat.

Cuth Harrison secured pole position for Heat 1 at 2:03.8, but retired with a broken half-shaft and the heat went to Reg Parnell from Tony Rolt and John Bolster, Bolster setting the fastest lap at 1:57.9. George Abecassis retired with valve trouble.

Prince Bira secured pole position for Heat 2 at 2:00.2. He won with the fastest lap at 1:53.6, the fastest time of the weekend, with David Hampshire second and Duncan Hamilton third. Peter Walker retired with gearbox issues, while Leslie Johnson was a non-starter due to shock absorber trouble and getting sand in his supercharger.

In the final, Rolt led into the first corner but Bira assumed the lead by lap 3. Bira's engine was not 100% fit, preventing him from pushing hard. Rolt applied intense pressure, closing the gap consistently throughout the race but lacking the pace advantage to make an overtake. The two were separated by a single car length at the chequered flag, Bira's engine screaming as he did not want to risk losing ground with a gear change. Leslie Brooke ran third before stopping for oil and going on to finish 6th. Kenneth Hutchinson was 10th despite only having top gear for most of the race. Michael Chorlton, whose car struggled with carburation issues all day, reached the finish albeit nine laps down.

Entries

Classification

Heat 1

Heat 2

Final

Footnotes

References

Zandvoort Grand Prix
Dutch Grand Prix
Zandvoort Grand Prix